The Zombie Auto 150 was an annual 150-lap  ARCA Menards Series East race held at Bristol Motor Speedway. It was held as part of the spring NASCAR weekend at the track. The race was replaced by the Bush's Beans 200, a second race at Bristol that started in 2019 and later in 2020 it became a combination race between ARCA Menards Series East and ARCA Menards Series.

History
Nelson Piquet Jr. won the inaugural race in 2012, becoming the first Brazilian driver to win a NASCAR race. The race was extended from 125 to 150 laps in 2018 and also implemented a stage racing format. Sam Mayer led all 150 laps in 2019 to secure the victory.

Past winners

 2012 and 2014: Race extended due to a green-white-checker finish.
 2017: Race shortened due to rain.
 2020: Race cancelled due to the COVID-19 pandemic.

References

External links
 

NASCAR races at Bristol Motor Speedway
ARCA Menards Series East
Recurring sporting events established in 2012
2012 establishments in Tennessee